Michael D. Moore is the Senior Pastor and Founder of the 6400-member megachurch, Faith Chapel Christian Center and Mike Moore Ministries in Birmingham, Alabama. The church's 3,000-seat Word Dome is situated on approximately 140 acres.
 
In addition to his pastorate, Moore is the author of three books, God's Heavenly Banking System, Tithing: What A Difference A Dime Makes, and The Word Rich Is Not A Bad Word.

His church, Faith Chapel, has grown from the living room of his home in April 1981
to house its very large congregation today.

External links
Faith Chapel Christian Center
Mike Moore Ministries

References

Year of birth missing (living people)
Living people
American Christian clergy
American television evangelists